PKP class OKl27 is a class of ordinary passenger (O) tank (K) 2-6-2 (l) steam locomotives designed in 1927 for Polskie Koleje Państwowe (Polish State Railways, PKP). It was the first completely Polish construction. The design was prepared by eng. Bryling.

History

Production
Hipolit Cegielski Metal Works in Poznań produced 122 engines in the period of 1928–1933.

Operation
The OKl27 class serviced mainly local transport, especially suburban lines.

Wartime
After the German invasion of Poland in World War II, 107 of the 122 OKl27 locomotives were taken into the Deutsche Reichsbahn fleet as 75 1201 to 75 1307. The remaining 15 were taken into the stock of the Soviet Railways; all but two of which came into German hands and were renumbered 75 1308 to 75 1320.

After the war, most locomotives were restored to Poland and renumbered. While the post-war class remained the same, locomotives were renumbered at random, so a locomotive's pre- and post war identities are (usually) completely different.

Preservation
Four engines have survived: 
OKl27-10 in Skierniewice (as an exhibit), 
OKl27-26 in Warsaw Railroad Museum (as an exhibit), 
OKl27-27 in Gdynia (as an exhibit), and 
OKl27-41 in Chabówka.

See also
PKP classification system

References

 
 
 

Railway locomotives introduced in 1928
Ol27K
2-6-2T locomotives
Standard gauge locomotives of Poland